Marc Fitzpatrick  (born 11 May 1986 in Lanark) is a Scottish professional footballer who plays for Airdrieonians as a left winger or left back. He has previously played for Motherwell, Ross County, Queen of the South and Greenock Morton.

Career

Club
Fitzpatrick came through the youth system at Motherwell and made his debut against Celtic on 12 May 2004.

In 2004–05, Fitzpatrick scored a last-minute winner in a Scottish League Cup semi-final against Hearts at Easter Road. The 3–2 win after extra time earned Motherwell their first major final appearance since the 1991 Scottish Cup Final. Remarkably, it was his first senior goal for the club. In May 2008, Fitzpatrick signed a two-year contract extension with the Fir Park outfit.

On 13 January 2011, Fitzpatrick signed a two-year deal with Highland team Ross County, after rejecting the offer of a six-month extension at Fir Park.

Fitzpatrick joined the Dumfries club, Queen of the South on 19 March 2013, until the end of the season after playing as a trialist on 16 March 2013 at Gayfield Park versus Arbroath, where he played for 65 minutes. On 7 April 2013, he played the full match as Queen of the South won the 2013 Scottish Challenge Cup, defeating Partick Thistle 6–5 on penalties following a 1–1 draw after extra-time.

Fitzpatrick moved to Greenock Morton on 9 July 2013, after playing in a trial match against former club Motherwell on the Saturday. He left the club at the end of the season in search of part-time football.

On 4 June 2014, Fitzpatrick signed for Airdrieonians where he has since been made captain.

International
Fitzpatrick made three appearances for the Scotland under-21 side in 2007.

Career statistics

Honours
Motherwell
Scottish League Cup: runner-up 2004–05

Ross County
Scottish First Division: 2011–12
Scottish Challenge Cup: 2010–11

Queen of the South
Scottish Challenge Cup: 2012–13

See also
Greenock Morton F.C. season 2013–14

References

External links

Living people
1986 births
Scottish footballers
Association football wingers
Motherwell F.C. players
Ross County F.C. players
Queen of the South F.C. players
Greenock Morton F.C. players
Airdrieonians F.C. players
Scottish Premier League players
Scottish Football League players
Scotland under-21 international footballers
Association football fullbacks
Sportspeople from Lanark
Scottish Professional Football League players
Footballers from South Lanarkshire